"Where Grass Won't Grow" is a song by American country music singer George Jones.  It was written by Earl "Peanut" Montgomery, one of Jones' favorite songwriters, and tells the story of the hardships faced by a family living on a twelve-acre farm in south Tennessee.   The song features a gentle mandolin and three modulations that build to a redemptive closing but, despite a moving vocal from Jones, the single, released on Musicor in 1970, stalled at #28 on the Billboard country singles chart.  He would record it again in 1994 with Emmylou Harris, Dolly Parton, and Trisha Yearwood for the Bradley Barn Sessions.

Discography

1970 songs
Songs written by Earl Montgomery
George Jones songs
Song recordings produced by Pappy Daily
Musicor Records singles